Bulandi is a 1990 Pakistani Urdu feature film, directed by Javed Fazil. Its producer is Aslam Butt, a Lollywood film starring  Nadeem, Samina Peerzada, Reema Khan, Shaan. Introducing new actors Reema and Shaan in this film.

Plot
The film starts off by showing the relationship of Nadeem and Samina Peerzada, They soon end up having a baby boy Shaan. Shaan  is friends with Reema, who belongs to a family much richer than his family. The first encounter was when Shaan (one or two years older than Reema) gave a doll to a crying Reema, when he was only around four years of age. The families then split leaving the two friends separated.

Once older, they meet each other without knowing their past, having a disgusted perception of each other. While Reema's jogging, Shaan accidentally splashes her with mud ... This causes her to do the same on him, but instead of a bit of mud, she drops him in the mud, while he's on his bicycle. After their first unpleasant meeting, they somehow fall in love. Once returning home Reema finds out that her father has planned her marriage with somebody she does not love. The father does this for greed of money. Reema refuses and spends her time with Shaan.

Shaan's parents meet their son's child-friend and his lover, and accept their relationship. They go to Reema's father's home to ask for his daughter's hand. He rejects the offer. Nadeem begs him, but he does not give in. Nadeem's wife, with a fatal heart injury, dies of a heart attack.

Cast
 Nadeem
 Afzaal Ahmed
 Samina Peerzada
 Reema Khan 
 Shaan Shahid as Shaan
 Madiha Shah
 Faisal Rehman as Ali

Film songs
Film musical score was by M. Arshad and film song lyrics were by Masroor Anwar.
 Aakhri saans tak tujh ko chahoon ga, Sung by 	Mehnaz Begum, Akhlaq Ahmed
 Phoolon mein, kalion mein, ankhon ki galion mein, Mehnaz Begum
 Aa palkon ki chhaon mein, mein geet tera ... 
 I Love You, Reema ... I Love You, Shaani ... 	Mehnaz Begum, A. Nayyar
 Kahan geya who tera waada ... (sad version) 	Mehnaz Begum, Akhlaq Ahmed
 Sawan pyar ka pehla sawan ... Mehnaz Begum
 Mera naam, tera naam ... (sad version) Mehnaz Begum

References

External links 
  

1990 films
Pakistani romantic drama films
1990s Urdu-language films
Films scored by M Ashraf

Urdu-language Pakistani films